Cutis rhomboidalis nuchae is a skin condition of the posterior neck, characterized by deep furrowing of the skin.

See also 
 List of cutaneous conditions
 Poikiloderma of Civatte
 Solar elastosis

References

External links 

Abnormalities of dermal fibrous and elastic tissue